Boiga angulata, commonly known as the Leyte cat snake or Philippine blunt-headed tree snake, is a species rear-fanged of snake in the family Colubridae. The species is endemic to the Philippines. It is considered mildly venomous. This snake feeds on birds and eggs and as well as lizards such as flying lizards and geckoes.

Geographic range
The snake is found in the Philippines.

References 

Reptiles described in 1861
Taxa named by Wilhelm Peters
Reptiles of the Philippines
angulata